Three's a Crowd (also known as Three's Company, Too in the Three's Company syndication package) is an American sitcom television series produced as a spin-off continuation of Three's Company that aired on ABC from September 25, 1984 (only one week after the final episode of Three's Company was broadcast) until April 9, 1985, with reruns airing until September 10, 1985. It is loosely based on the British sitcom Robin's Nest, which was itself a spin-off of Man About the House, upon which Three's Company was based.

Plot
In Three's Company's final episodes, Vicky Bradford (Mary Cadorette) is introduced as a love interest of Jack Tripper (John Ritter), beginning with the episode titled "Cupid Works Overtime." In the following two-part episode, "Friends and Lovers", Jack proposes marriage, but Vicky, afraid of marriage after witnessing her parents' tumultuous relationship and bitter divorce, declines the offer. Vicky instead convinces Jack to move in with her in the vacant apartment above his restaurant. Vicky's wealthy father James Bradford (Robert Mandan) buys the building from Jack's former boss, Frank Angelino. James does not approve of Jack and he constantly tries to disrupt his and Vicky's relationship.

Other characters include E.Z. Taylor (Alan Campbell), Jack's eccentric assistant at the bistro, and Claudia Bradford (Jessica Walter), Vicky's mother and James' ex-wife.

Cast

Main
 John Ritter as Jack Tripper
 Mary Cadorette as Victoria "Vicky" Bradford
 Robert Mandan as James Bradford
 Alan Campbell as E.Z. Taylor

Recurring
 Jessica Walter as Claudia Bradford

Production history
Three's Company had been based on the sitcom Man About the House, which aired on ITV in the United Kingdom from 1973 to 1976. When the series concluded, producers Brian Cooke and Johnnie Mortimer devised two spin-offs. The first was George and Mildred, which ran from 1976 to 1979 and starred Brian Murphy and Yootha Joyce as their George and Mildred Roper characters. The second spin-off was Robin's Nest, which ran from 1977 to 1981 and featured Richard O'Sullivan as Robin Tripp (the basis of the Jack Tripper character), who runs the titular restaurant along with his live-in girlfriend and her antagonistic father.

Three's Company's producers were eager to capitalize on these spin-offs. In 1979, they had spun off The Ropers, based on George and Mildred, but the show ran for only one and a half seasons. Executive producers Ted Bergmann and Don Taffner attempted to adapt the Robin's Nest series, but without John Ritter. A pilot for a series called Byrd's Nest was written with the same premise as Robin's Nest, with a young man living with his older girlfriend and her disapproving father, who owns the building in which they live. The series was planned as a spin-off from Three's Company and possibly a vehicle for Richard Kline, but ABC passed on the idea. As Three's Company entered its eighth season in September 1983, ratings took a dive in the face of stiff competition from the new NBC series The A-Team, and ABC approved the development of a new series to be called Three's a Crowd, starring Ritter.

Development and casting of the new series occurred in secret as Three's Companys eighth season progressed. Ritter's cast members Richard Kline, Joyce DeWitt, Priscilla Barnes and Don Knotts were kept out of the loop. During a Christmas hiatus in late 1983, producers auditioned several female leads to play Jack's new love interest Vicky Bradford, and eventually decided upon Broadway actress Mary Cadorette. An embarrassing situation arose when DeWitt accidentally walked in on the auditions after visiting the studio to set up her dressing room at the end of the hiatus. Informed of the spin-off project and the looming cancellation of Three's Company, DeWitt was upset by the secrecy but soon reconciled with Ritter. She and Barnes found it difficult to tape the rest of the season, as both actresses learned that their characters would conclude with the series finale. Kline and Knotts were offered recurring roles on Three's a Crowd, but both declined the offer (Kline would make a guest appearance on the show in early 1985). Suzanne Somers reportedly lobbied to reprise her Three's Company character Chrissy Snow as Jack's love interest in the spin-off.

Transition
In transitioning from Three's Company to Three's a Crowd, series producers decided to follow the plot line of the British series. Season 8 of Three's Company drew to a close in a three-episode story arc. In the first of the three episodes, Janet meets wealthy art collector Phillip Dawson. In the second episode, she falls in love with him, while Jack meets and falls in love with stewardess Vicky Bradford. Her wealthy father, played by Robert Mandan, does not approve of the relationship. When first aired, the episode ended with the words "To be continued... next fall", and when rerun late in the summer, this was changed to "To be continued... next week." The last episode of Three's Company aired as an hour-long special that kicked off the 1984–85 fall television season and set up the premise for Three's a Crowd. In the finale, Janet marries Phillip, Terri moves to Hawaii, while Jack and Vicky profess their love for one another, but Vicky, the child of a bitter divorce, turns down Jack's marriage proposal. They instead move in together in an apartment above Jack's bistro. In the last scene, Jack and Vicky are spending their first romantic evening together in the new apartment, only to have Mr. Bradford accidentally barge in on them, explaining that he has bought the building. The title card for Three's Company then appears over the screen with the word "COMPANY" zooming out, being replaced with "A CROWD".

Three's a Crowd employed most of the same writers, producers, and staff from Three's Company, but the new show's style was changed. While the Jack Tripper character was the lead role in Three's Company, the show featured an ensemble cast of three with some other series regulars. However, the new show was centered around Jack. Vicky, her parents and E.Z. played supporting roles. The new show also employed more slapstick comedy for Ritter. The events and characters of the previous show were not mentioned, except in a late-season episode in which Larry Dallas appears.

Ratings and cancellation
Three's a Crowd garnered moderate ratings, having to compete with The A-Team on NBC. When the 1984–85 television season finished, the show placed 39th out of 77 shows with a 14.5/22 rating/share. This put the show on the fence with ABC, as it had enough of an audience to warrant renewal but its ratings paled in comparison to those of Three's Companys and The A-Team, which finished sixth for the season. The network would commit to only a half-season of 13 episodes to see how the series would place, and Ritter reportedly said that he would not return to the show unless a full season was ordered. Finally, ABC decided instead to pick up Diff'rent Strokes, which had just been canceled by NBC.

Episodes

Reruns
Daytime reruns aired on ABC from September 23, 1985 to January 3, 1986, followed by another prime-time run on USA Network. Some syndicated versions aired under the title Three's Company, Too, using the theme song of Three's Company.

Six episodes of the series were aired on TV Land in September 2006, and four episodes were aired on WGN America in October 2008. The series began airing on digital broadcast network Antenna TV in June 2011 (as Three's a Crowd with its "Side by Side" theme song). The series is offered streaming in the U.S. as of July 2021 on Pluto TV and as of June 2022 on Tubi.

References

External links
 
 
 
 Sitcoms Online: Three's a Crowd

1980s American sitcoms
1984 American television series debuts
1985 American television series endings
American Broadcasting Company original programming
American television series based on British television series
American television spin-offs
English-language television shows
Television controversies in the United States
Television series set in restaurants
Television shows set in Los Angeles
Three's Company